Tordas is a village in Fejér county, Hungary.

References

External links 

 Official Homepage 
 Street map 

Populated places in Fejér County